Pierre Bertrand  may refer to:

Pierre Bertrand (cardinal) (1280–1348 or 1349), French cardinal and theologian
Pierre Bertrand de Colombier (1299–1361), cardinal, nephew of the above
Pierre Bertrand (politician) (1875–1948), Canadian politician
Pierre Bertrand (singer) (born 1948), singer-songwriter and former member of Beau Dommage
Pierre Bertrand (sound engineer) (born 1965), Canadian sound engineer, winner at 32nd Genie Awards 
Pierre Louis Bertrand, known as Pete Bertrand (racing driver) (1902–1942), Kansas racing driver, see Mr. Horsepower